Kyle Lamar Myers (born May 9, 1986) is an American podcaster and former YouTuber known under the stage name FPSRussia and FPSKyle. His YouTube channel features Myers portraying the fictional role of Dimitri Potapov, a heavily accented "professional Russian" from Moscow. His videos center around the usage of large amounts of firearms and explosives.

The FPSRussia channel launched in April 2010 and found success early, reaching one million subscribers in June 2011. Myers ceased producing new videos in 2016 following the unsolved death of one of his associates and a Bureau of Alcohol, Tobacco, Firearms and Explosives (ATF) felony charge. 

As of August 2022, his channel has still garnered over 6.9 million subscribers and 950 million views. Since the FPSRussia channel has gone inactive, Myers continues to maintain an online presence as the co-host of Painkiller Already (PKA), a podcast he co-founded in 2010.

Channel history

Background and early success
Before Myers started FPSRussia, he ran a YouTube channel called "klm5986". Centered around Call of Duty gameplay commentary, this channel often featured videos with other YouTube personalities, such as xSocrates. He later wanted to show how guns worked in real life and to compare them to how they are portrayed in video games, films, and television shows. 

He got the idea for a Russian accent while working at a car dealership. One of his co-workers was Russian and he took an interest in impersonating his accent. His uncle was also a prankster and used to use the accent while talking to Kyle when he was five years old. He used the accent to create the character Dimitri and what followed was him filming himself shooting guns on his family farm in Georgia. 

Each video on the channel generally has Myers (as Dimitri) explaining the characteristics of the weapons he will use in that video (occasionally telling the history behind it and sometimes explanations of its purpose), before he demonstrates their abilities on random targets such as fruit, drink bottles, zombie mannequins, and even photos of Justin Bieber in his earlier videos. Myers has used largely varying pieces of equipment along with weapons that have been featured in his videos, such as a gold plated AK-47, an armored troop carrier, a .50 BMG rifle, Bofors 40 mm automatic anti-aircraft cannon and most famously an AA-12.

The channel reached the one-million-subscriber mark in June 2011. Following the channel's early success, Myers launched a second channel, MoreFPSRussia, in September 2011.

Collaborations and appearances in other media
The success of FPSRussia propelled Myers to appear on other channels and media; Myers collaborated with Epic Meal Time in July 2011, and the collaboration has earned over 8.8 million video views on YouTube as of October 14, 2020. 

Myers' character hosted the live fire section of Machinima.com Prime's web series, The Controller: Medal of Honor Warfighter.

On October 29, 2012, Myers had a cameo appearance as his character, Dimitri, in the Call of Duty: Black Ops II live-action trailer directed by Guy Ritchie.

Death of Keith Ratliff
On January 3, 2013, a Kentucky man named Keith Ratliff, the co-owner of FPS Industries (a custom firearms fabrication and testing company) and a member of the FPSRussia production team, was found shot dead in his home in Carnesville, Georgia. Ratliff held a Federal Firearms License (FFL) and was responsible for obtaining the firearms used in the videos. 

Following Ratliff's death, the production of FPSRussia's videos went on hiatus until February 19, 2013. In March 2013, the Georgia Bureau of Investigation (GBI) said it was still investigating. However, as there have been no official updates since the initial reports following Ratliff's death, the case has become the subject of numerous conspiracy theories.

Final years
After a nine-month hiatus, on January 10, 2014, FPSRussia returned to YouTube. In 2014, FPSRussia was listed on NewMediaRockstars Top 100 Channels, ranked at #78. The channel has been inactive since April 2016.

Related ventures
After an announcement video in December 2012 and a successful Kickstarter campaign, FPSRussia released "FPS Russia: The Game" on the App Store for iOS devices in March 2013 with developer Zaah.

In 2013, Myers founded another gaming channel named "FPS" that has been inactive since 2014.

Legal issues
On March 29, 2013, Myers' Franklin County residence was searched by upwards of 40 members of the ATF alongside agents from the GBI. The investigators also searched Myers's father's nearby farm, a frequent filming location for FPSRussia. ATF spokesman Richard Coes said the justification for the search was "that [Myers] was using explosives and getting paid for it via YouTube."

In August 2017, Myers' residence was again raided by ATF and GBI agents after Myers was alleged to have received 25 grams of butane hash oil through the mail. The Department of Justice prosecuted on the grounds that illegal drug possession while owning a firearm is a federal offense. Myers was arrested for felony possession of a controlled substance with intent to distribute and 50 of his weapons were confiscated under Section 922(g)(3) of the Gun Control Act of 1968, which prohibits illegal drug users from possessing firearms. He later pleaded guilty to Possession with Intent to Distribute Marijuana and Butane Hash Oil, with all other charges dismissed. 

On June 19, 2019, Myers was sentenced to two years' probation and 56 days in prison, which he served at Federal Correctional Institution, Talladega in 2019, as well as a fine in the amount of $7,500. Since his release from prison, Myers has spoken about the case on his YouTube podcast Painkiller Already.

Other ventures
In 2010, Myers co-founded the podcast Painkiller Already with YouTubers WoodysGamertag and WingsOfRedemption; the show is now hosted by Myers, WoodysGamertag and MurkaDurkah.

See also
List of YouTubers

References

External links

1986 births
2010 web series debuts
2016 web series endings
American people convicted of drug offenses
American podcasters
American YouTubers
Gun writers
Living people
People from Lavonia, Georgia
YouTube channels closed in 2016
YouTube channels launched in 2010